Sant'Alessandro della Croce is a Baroque style, Roman Catholic church located on Via Pignolo in Bergamo, region of Lombardy, Italy.

History
The church was erected in 1675 at the site of a prior church. The design is attributed to the Trezzini family. The church was complete by 1737, but the facade was not only complete until 1922, in a project by Virgilio Muzio.

Among the works inside the church is a Coronation of the Virgin (1576) by Giovanni Battista Moroni, and canvases by Giovanni Paolo Cavagna and Enea Salmeggia (1621). A canvas of St Carlo Borromeo tending those afflicted with plague (1720) by Giovanni Battista Parodi. The decoration of the Chapel of Suffragio (1730) was painted by Sebastiano Ricci, who depicted St Gregory the Great intercedes with the Virgin. The chapel was also has a canvas by Cignaroli depicting Story of Judas Maccabee (1743). Cignaroli also painted a large Deposition (1745) located in the right transept; Giovanni Battista Pittoni painted a Madonna and Saints (1746; 3rd chapel on left); Francesco Cappella painted an Encounter of Christ and the Virgin for the Altar of the Assunta (1774); and Giovanni Raggi painted for the Chapel of the Oration (1757). This chapel is dedicated to the Eucharist, and has a polychrome marble altar 1729 by Andrea Fantoni.

References

Churches in Bergamo
Roman Catholic churches completed in 1737
17th-century Roman Catholic church buildings in Italy